Makdous ( or sometimes ) is a dish of oil-cured aubergines. Part of Iraqi and Levantine cuisine (Jordan, Lebanon, Palestine, Israel, Syria), they are tiny, tangy eggplants stuffed with walnuts, red pepper, garlic, olive oil, and salt. Sometimes chilli powder is added.

Makdous is usually prepared by Syrian households around fall to supply for winter, and is usually eaten during breakfast, supper or as a snack.

See also
 List of stuffed dishes

References

Arab cuisine
Levantine cuisine
Appetizers
Jordanian cuisine
Lebanese cuisine
Vegetarian cuisine
Palestinian cuisine
Syrian cuisine
Stuffed vegetable dishes
Eggplant dishes